Hemispheres is the fourth studio album by the classical guitarist Lily Afshar, released in 2006 through Archer Records.

Track listing

Reception
The album was well received, called "A skillful combination of contemporary classical music with Persian traditional music". A reviewer wrote of "The naturally warm, rich and resonating guitar sound", and another described the album as "...melodic, with [...] ethnic rhythms".

Personnel
 Lily Afshar - Classical guitar

References

External links
Official website
Myspace page
Last.fm page

2006 classical albums
World music albums
Archer Records albums